Everyman's War is an independent narrative feature war film directed by Thad Smith. It was released on DVD in the U.S. on May 18, 2010 by Virgil Films & Entertainment and in 43 countries internationally by Koan Entertainment. Additionally it was released  in Spain by Paramount Pictures in May 2010 under the title "Los héroes de Las Árdenas." 
Based on the true story of Sgt. Don Smith of the 94th Infantry Division. Much of the film takes place during January 1945 near Nennig, Germany in the Battle of the Bulge. The film was judged 'Best Narrative Feature' at the 2009 GI Film Festival and a "Film Excellence" award for directing by the Film Oregon Alliance.

Cast 
 Cole Carson as Sgt. Don Smith
 Laurent Bair as Dorrine
 Mike Prosser as Cpl. Starks
 Sean McGrath as Pvt. Benedetto
 Eric Martin Reid as Pvt. Fuller
 Brian Julian as Pvt. Heinrich

Awards 
 2009 GI Film Festival Best Narrative Feature 
 2009 Film Excellence Award by Film Oregon

References

External links
 
 
 
 WOTN Movie Review
 Outlook Portland news article
 Military History Blog Review
 94th Infantry Division Historical Society 

2009 films
2009 independent films
2000s war films
American war films
Films set in 1944
Films set in 1945
War epic films
American World War II films
Western Front of World War II films
Films about Nazi Germany
2000s English-language films
2000s American films